Jeremy Pope (born July 9, 1992) is an American actor and singer. Pope is the sixth person in Tony Award history to be nominated in two categories for separate performances during the same year, when he received nominations for Best Actor in a Leading Role in a Play for his role as Pharus Jonathan Young in Choir Boy and Best Actor in a Featured Role in a Musical for his role as Eddie Kendricks in Ain't Too Proud in 2019, the latter of which also earned him a nomination for a 2020 Grammy Award for Best Musical Theater Album.

In 2020, Pope starred in the Netflix miniseries Hollywood, which earned him a nomination for a 2020 Primetime Emmy Award for Outstanding Actor in a Leading Role in a Limited or Anthology Series or Movie. In 2023, he received a Golden Globe nomination for his performance in the film The Inspection.

Life and acting career
A native of Orlando, Florida, Pope attended Timber Creek High School and the American Musical and Dramatic Academy. He made his Broadway debut in 2018 as Pharus Jonathan Young in the play Choir Boy, soon followed by a role as Eddie Kendricks in the jukebox musical Ain't Too Proud. In 2019, he became the sixth actor in Tony Award history to be nominated in two categories during the same year, garnering nominations for Best Actor in a Leading Role in a Play for his role as Pharus Jonathan Young in Choir Boy and for Best Actor in a Featured Role in a Musical for his role as Eddie Kendricks in Ain't Too Proud. In 2019, he landed a lead role in Ryan Murphy's new Netflix series Hollywood, for which he was nominated for the Primetime Emmy Award for Outstanding Lead Actor in a Limited Series or Movie. In 2021, he also had a main role as Christopher, Blanca's boyfriend in the third and final season of Murphy's TV series Pose. In 2022, Pope returned to the theater, starring as painter Jean-Michel Basquiat opposite Paul Bettany as pop artist Andy Warhol in The Collaboration.

Personal life
Pope began portraying Pharus Jonathan Young, his character in Choir Boy, at age nineteen. In an interview with Entertainment Weekly, he described the role's personal significance to him, "as he himself was growing up Black and gay".

Acting credits

Theatre

Film

Television

Music 
A singer known for his passionate vocal style, Pope credits his music aspirations to his early years of singing in church, as well as during theater productions and talent shows at school. He also cites music as a constant mainstay in his life. Outside of his acting and Broadway theatre work, he writes and records his own music. His music gained attention with his first independent single, the self-written, acoustic pop-oriented "Wait For You", which also debuted as a YouTube video in 2015. In 2018, he independently released his second single, the R&B-flavored "New Love", for which he also produced its music video in 2017. That same year, in 2018, he released his third independent single, "Feel So Good" and produced its music video. He is a featured vocalist on "Be Great", the 2019 single by actress and singer Laura Dreyfuss (under her pseudonym Loladre). He is a principal soloist on Broadway cast recordings for The View UpStairs and Ain't Too Proud: The Life and Times of the Temptations, the latter of which garnered him a nomination for Grammy Award for Best Musical Theater Album in 2020. Though he has covered music by several artists, including Lady Gaga and Maroon 5, he is said to be working on an EP with accompanying production work from various producers. On May 7, 2020, he released his fourth independent single, a cover of Cyndi Lauper's "Time After Time".

Singles discography

Accolades 

In June 2020, in honor of the 50th anniversary of the first LGBTQ Pride parade, Queerty named him among the fifty heroes “leading the nation toward equality, acceptance, and dignity for all people”.

See also 
 LGBT culture in New York City

References

External links 
 
 
 

1992 births
Living people
American male musical theatre actors
American male stage actors
American LGBT actors
LGBT people from Florida
LGBT African Americans
Male actors from Orlando, Florida
Timber Creek High School alumni